Bruce McAninch (born  in Strathroy-Caradoc, Ontario) is a Canadian wheelchair curler.

Teams

References

External links 

Bruce McAninch | CurlON

Living people
1950 births
People from Strathroy-Caradoc
Canadian male curlers
Canadian wheelchair curlers
Canadian wheelchair curling champions
Curlers from Ontario